In the United States, a regional railroad is a railroad company that is not Class I, but still has a substantial amount of traffic or trackage (and is thus not a short line). (The Class I threshold is $250 million, adjusted for inflation since 1991.)

List of regional railroads
The following railroads were classified as regional by the AAR in 2007.

References

See also
Regional Railroad of the Year
Regional rail, Regionalbahn — terms for intercity passenger services with more stops than an express service